Dead Men Walking are a British based rock supergroup with a multi national line-up, who have toured the UK, Ireland and the United States. From 2001 to 2006 they were led by Mike Peters of the Alarm and Kirk Brandon, of Spear of Destiny, with a varying cast of musicians. Since 2015, they split into two bands, one led by Peters called the Jack Tars, and another led by Brandon keeping the Dead Men Walking name.

Career
The band started in 2001, with Brandon and Peters being joined by Pete Wylie (Wah!) and Glen Matlock (Sex Pistols) for the first live album.  For the second album, Wylie was replaced by Billy Duffy (The Cult) and a drummer was added in Slim Jim Phantom (Stray Cats).  For the third album, Duffy was replaced by Bruce Watson (Big Country).  For the fourth and fifth albums, Watson dropped out and Matlock was replaced by Captain Sensible (The Damned) on bass.

The Peters/Brandon/Sensible/Phantom line-up recorded an original album in 2008, but it was never released as there were disagreements between the band members.

Eventually Peters revived the band in 2014 with Chris Cheney (The Living End) replacing Brandon.  This line-up produced the first album of original material by the band, Easy Piracy, the previous releases having all been live albums.

Brandon also formed a new version of the band, with Jake Burns (Stiff Little Fingers) and Dave Ruffy and John "Segs" Jennings (both of Ruts DC). After a name dispute, Brandon kept the name and Peters renamed his band as the Jack Tars.

Discography

Brandon/Peters line-up
 Live At Guildford (Resistance 001, 2001)
 Live At Leeds (Resistance 002, 2003)
 Live At The Darwen Library Theatre (Resistance 003, 2004) CD
 Live At The Darwen Library Theatre (Resistance DVD 002, 2004) DVD
 Live At CBGB New York City (Resistance 004, 2005)
 Graveyard Smashes Volume 1 (Resistance 005, 2006)

Peters line-up
 Easy Piracy (Slimstyle Records THIN0084, 2015)

Brandon line-up
 Live in Bristol (2016)

Members
Dead Men Walking are now – 
 Kirk Brandon – Spear Of Destiny, Theatre Of Hate
 Jake Burns – Stiff Little Fingers
 Dave Ruffy – Ruts DC
 John "Segs" Jennings – Ruts DC

The Jack Tars, are now –
Mike Peters – The Alarm (singer/rhythm guitar)
Chris Cheney – The Living End (lead guitar)
Slim Jim Phantom – Stray Cats (drummer)
Captain Sensible – The Damned (bass guitar)

Previous musicians include
Pete Wylie – Wah!
Glen Matlock – Sex Pistols
Bruce Watson – Big Country

Guest musicians include
Mick Jones - The Clash
Topper Headon - The Clash
Duff McKagan - Guns N' Roses
Derek Forbes - Spear of Destiny, Simple Minds
Billy Duffy - Theatre of Hate, The Cult
Lemmy - Motörhead
Brian Setzer - Stray Cats
Pauline Black – The Selecter
Fred Armisen - Saturday Night Live
Mike Scott - The Waterboys
Roddy Frame - Aztec Camera
Ian McNabb - The Icicle Works
Dave Dederer - Presidents of the United States of America

Timeline

References

External links
Original homepage (Archives from July 2003-Jan 2007)
Official website (Kirk Brandon's Dead Men Walking)
Facebook page (Mike Peters' The Jack Tars)

English rock music groups
British supergroups
Rock music supergroups